Scoring over 10,000 runs across a playing career in any format of cricket is considered a significant achievement., while in the case of One Day Internationals (ODIs) it is often referred as the 10,000 run club in ODI cricket. 

West Indian Desmond Haynes retired as the most prolific run scorer in ODIs, with a total of 8,648 runs in 1994. His record stood for four years until it was broken by India's Mohammed Azharuddin, who remained the top scorer in the format until his compatriot Tendulkar surpassed his tally in October 2000. In 2001, Tendulkar became the first player to cross the 10,000 run mark in ODIs, during the third match of the bi-lateral series against Australia at home. , fourteen players—from six teams that are Full Members of the International Cricket Council (ICC)—have scored 10,000 runs in ODIs. Out of these, five are from India, four are from Sri Lanka while two are from the West Indies. One player each from Australia, Pakistan and South Africa form the rest. No player from Bangladesh, England, New Zealand, Afghanistan, Ireland or Zimbabwe has passed the 10,000 run mark in ODIs yet.

In terms of innings, India's Virat Kohlithe fifth Indian to reach the milestone after Tendulkar, Sourav Ganguly, Rahul Dravid and MS Dhoniis the fastest (205) to reach the 10,000 run mark, while Sri Lanka's Mahela Jayawardene is the slowest to achieve the feat (333). Tendulkar holds multiple recordsmost appearances (463 matches), most runs (18,426) and highest number of both centuries (49) and half-centuries (96). Kohli has the highest average (58.07) and strike rate (93.17) among players who have performed the feat. Sri lanka's Sanath Jayasuriya also features in the list of bowlers who have taken 300 or more wickets in the format. As of 2022, Virat Kohli is the only active player in the format on this list.

Key
 First – denotes the year of debut
 Last – denotes the year of the latest match
 Mat. – denotes the number of matches played
 Inn. – denotes the number of innings batted
 Date – denotes the date on which the player reached the 10,000 run mark
 Span – denotes the time span between the player's debut and the date on which the player reached the 10,000 run mark
 10KI – denotes the number of innings the player took to reach 10,000 runs
  – denotes that the player is active in ODIs

Players with 10,000 or more ODI runs

By country

See also
 List of One Day International cricket records
 List of players who have scored 10,000 or more runs in Test cricket

Notes

References

External links
Elites of the 10,000-run club, and 2015 makes history with hundreds at the 2015 Wisden India Almanack

One Day International cricket records